Born to Boogie is the fortieth studio album by American musician Hank Williams Jr. It was released by Warner Bros. Records in July 1987. The title track, "Heaven Can't Be Found" and "Young Country" were released as singles. The album reached No. 1 on the Top Country Albums chart and has been certified Platinum by the RIAA. Born to Boogie also won the Country Music Association Album of the Year award in 1988 and the title track earned Williams nominations for the ACM Top Male Vocalist, the CMA Male Vocalist of the Year and the Grammy Award for Best Country Vocal Performance, Male.

Track listing

Personnel

 Barry Beckett – keyboards
 Richard Bennett – acoustic guitar
 Matt Betton – drums
 Bekka Bramlett – background vocals
 Ben Cauley – trumpet
 John Cowan – background vocals
 Jim Horn – baritone saxophone
 Wayne Jackson – trumpet
 John Barlow Jarvis – keyboards
 Mike Lawler – synthesizer
 "Cowboy" Eddie Long – steel guitar
 Carl Marsh – Fairlight, Fairlight III, programming
 Jerry McKinney – clarinet
 Terry McMillan – harmonica
 Michael Rhodes – bass guitar
 Charles Rose – trombone
 James Stroud – drums
 Harvey Thompson – tenor saxophone
 Wayne Turner – electric guitar
 Billy Joe Walker Jr. – acoustic guitar
 Hank Williams Jr. – lead vocals
 Reggie Young – electric guitar

Additional vocals on "Young Country"
T. Graham Brown, Butch Baker, Steve Earle, Highway 101, Dana McVicker, Marty Stuart, Keith Whitley

Charts

Weekly charts

Year-end charts

References 

1987 albums
Hank Williams Jr. albums
Warner Records albums
Albums produced by Barry Beckett
Albums produced by Jim Ed Norman